The New York County Board of the Gaelic Athletic Association, or New York GAA is one of the 3 county boards of the Gaelic Athletic Association (GAA) in North America, and is responsible for Gaelic games in the New York metropolitan area. The county board is also responsible for the New York county teams.

The county football team competes in the Connacht Senior Football Championship and the Tailteann Cup.

Football

Clubs

The two main competitions for clubs in the county are the New York Senior Football Championship and the New York Junior Football Championship.

The following football clubs are based in the county:
Astoria Gaels (defunct)
Saint Barnabas
St.Bridgids 
St Patrick’s GAA (Connecticut)
Brooklyn
Cavan New York
Celtics
Cork New York
Donegal New York
Kerry New York
Long Island Gaels (Point Lookout)
Longford New York
Manhattan
Mayo New York
Monaghan New York
O'Donovan Rossa (Astoria, Queens)
Offaly New York
Rangers
Raymonds
Rockland (Orangeburg)
Saint Patricks
Sligo New York
Shannon Gaels (College Point, Queens)
Tyrone New York
Westmeath New York

County team

The New York GAA has a long history in Gaelic games starting at a time of the mass immigration to New York from Ireland. The first organised hurling and football club in New York was founded in 1857. Since then football in New York has grown. At one point there were close to 40 football clubs in the New York GAA league. However, since the migration back to Ireland with that country's increasing economic prosperity (the Celtic Tiger), the number of clubs dwindled down to 31. In the past two years, the NY GAA has brought in two new teams, one (Na Clairsigh) from Albany and another (Four Provinces) from Philadelphia. But with the Meath team dropping out of the league competition due to too few players and other teams combining together, participation has declined. However, the renovation of Gaelic Park and increased participation by underage teams are measures that have been taken to increase participation again without having to rely on players imported from Ireland.

Hurling

Clubs

The main competition for clubs in the county is the New York Senior Hurling Championship.

The following hurling clubs are based in the county:
Bronx Warriors (defunct)
Galway New York
Hoboken Guards
Rockland
Shannon Gaels
Tipperary New York
Ulster New York
Waterford New York
Westmeath New York
Limerick New York

County team
The first organised hurling and Gaelic football club in New York was founded in 1857. In the following 30 years, the New York, Emmet, Wolfe Tone, Brooklyn, Geraldine and Men of Ireland clubs were set up. The Gaelic Athletic Association's successful North American tour had a notable effect on the growth of hurling in New York and North America in general by the end of the 19th century. At this time, the Keane Gaelic Hurling Trophy began to be awarded to the club which won the New York senior championship.

New York's county team have had a number of notable hurling achievements, particularly the 1958 win over Wexford. In 1969, New York defeated Kilkenny over two legs in what was described as a "world championship cup".

In the 2006 Ulster Senior Hurling Championship, New York scored a famous 1-18 to 1-12 win over Derry. This entitled them to take part in the Ulster final, which had to be delayed because the New York players had trouble travelling, see 2006 All-Ireland Senior Hurling Championship. The delayed game took place in Boston on Sunday October 22, 2006 as a curtain-raiser to the Interprovincial Championship football final; New York lost 2-20 – 1-14 to Antrim. New York did not play in the 2007 Ulster Senior Hurling Championship.

New York won an All-Ireland Senior B Hurling Championship in 1996.

In November 2022, New York was confirmed as a participant in the 2023 Connacht Hurling League.

Camogie
Camogie, a version of hurling for ladies, is also played by several clubs in New York. The 2010 camogie champion was Na Fianna who retained their title by defeating Cavan 0-17 to 1-10.

Ladies' football
New York has a number of ladies' football teams. The county also fields a ladies' team in the Women's World Cup (this tournament does not include Irish sides).

References

External links

New York GAA Board website

 
Gaelic sports
Irish-American culture in New York City
Sports in the New York metropolitan area